Carex siccata, common names including dryspike sedge, is a species of Carex native to North America. It is listed as endangered in New Jersey. , USDA Plants regards Carex foenea as a synonym of C. siccata, whereas the World Checklist of Selected Plant Families regards only two varieties of C. foenea as synonyms, treating C. foenea itself as a separate species.

References

siccata
Flora of North America